is a Japanese judoka who won the gold medal in the men's under 66 kg division at the 2004 Summer Olympics in Athens, Greece, and at the 2008 Summer Olympics in Beijing, China.

Biography
To win the Olympic gold at Athens, he defeated Jozef Krnáč of Slovakia. Of winning the gold, he said, "I wanted this so badly I wouldn't have cared if it was my last fight ever," though his comments were officially translated as: "It is probably my last Olympics, that is why I am proud of my medal." At the 2005 Judo World Championships, he won silver in his division. He also won the gold medal at the 2008 Summer Olympics against Benjamin Darbelet of France.

Starting in April 2010, Uchishiba coached the women's judo team at Kyushu University of Nursing and Social Welfare in Kumamoto Prefecture. In November 2011, the school released Uchishiba from his coaching position following sexual harassment allegations. On 6 December 2011, he was arrested by the Tokyo Metropolitan Police Department on suspicion of rape in Tokyo in September 2011.  Uchishiba said that the act was consensual. On 1 February 2013, Tokyo District Court has declined his claim as "impossible to trust", and sentenced him to 5 years in prison.

Honours
Medal with Purple Ribbon (2004, 2008) (In 2011, deprived)

References

External links
 
 
 Videos of Masato Uchishiba in action (judovision.org)

Olympic judoka of Japan
People from Kumamoto Prefecture
Living people
1978 births
Judoka at the 2004 Summer Olympics
Judoka at the 2008 Summer Olympics
Olympic gold medalists for Japan
Olympic medalists in judo
Asian Games medalists in judo
Japanese rapists
Medalists at the 2008 Summer Olympics
Judoka at the 2002 Asian Games
Japanese male judoka
Medalists at the 2004 Summer Olympics
Asian Games bronze medalists for Japan
Medalists at the 2002 Asian Games
Universiade medalists in judo
Universiade gold medalists for Japan
20th-century Japanese people
21st-century Japanese people